There are nine counties named Knox County in the United States, all named after Brigadier General Henry Knox who would later serve as the first Secretary of War:

Knox County, Illinois
Knox County, Indiana
Knox County, Kentucky
Knox County, Maine
Knox County, Missouri
Knox County, Nebraska
Knox County, Ohio
Knox County, Tennessee
Knox County, Texas